Tony Ries can refer to:

 Tony Ries Sr. (1913-1989), South African Olympic wrestler
 Tony Ries Jr. (born 1939), South African Olympic wrestler and son of the above